1952 was the 53rd season of County Championship cricket in England. It was the beginning of Surrey's period of dominance as they won the first of seven successive County Championships. England defeated India 3–0 in the Test series.

Honours
County Championship – Surrey
Minor Counties Championship – Buckinghamshire
Wisden (Wisden Cricketers of the Year in the 1953 edition for their record in the 1952 season) – Harold Gimblett, Tom Graveney, David Sheppard, Stuart Surridge, Fred Trueman

County Championship

Test series

England defeated India 3–0 with one match rained off in a four-match series.  India had no answer to the pace of Fred Trueman and the guile of Alec Bedser, who between them took 49 Test wickets.

Leading batsmen

Leading bowlers

References

Annual reviews
 Playfair Cricket Annual 1953
 Wisden Cricketers' Almanack 1953

External links
 CricketArchive – season summary

1952 in English cricket
English cricket seasons in the 20th century